The 1894–95 season was Newcastle United's second season in the Second Division of The Football League. Newcastle suffered their record defeat in the final game of the season, a 0–9 loss against Burton Wanderers.

Appearances and goals

Competitions

League

FA Cup

Friendlies

Matches

League

FA Cup

Friendlies

References

External links
Newcastle United - Historical Football Kits
Season Details - 1894-95 - toon1892
NUFC.com Archives – Match Stats – 1894–95
Newcastle United 1894–1895 Home – statto.com

Newcastle United F.C. seasons
Newcastle United